The Best of Survivor is a 2006 compilation album by the American rock band Survivor, containing 14 songs from 1981 to 1988.

Track listing
All songs written by Jim Peterik and Frankie Sullivan, except where noted.

"Eye of the Tiger" - 4:07
"I Can't Hold Back" - 3:59
"High on You" - 4:09
"Poor Man's Son" - 3:26
"The Search Is Over" - 4:14
"American Heartbeat" - 4:11
"Burning Heart" - 3:51
"Is This Love" - 3:43
"Ever Since the World Began" - 3:43
"The One That Really Matters" (Peterik) - 3:30
"Caught in the Game" - 4:47
"The Moment of Truth" (Peter Beckett, Bill Conti, Dennis Lambert) - 3:47
"Rebel Son" - 4:39
"Didn't Know It Was Love" - 4:23

References

External links
 

Survivor (band) albums
2006 greatest hits albums
Volcano Entertainment compilation albums
Legacy Recordings compilation albums